Alton Beckford (born 20 November 1986) is a Jamaican cricketer. He played in two List A matches for the Jamaican cricket team in 2005/06.

See also
 List of Jamaican representative cricketers

References

External links
 

1986 births
Living people
Jamaican cricketers
Jamaica cricketers
People from Saint Elizabeth Parish